0-9 

This is an incomplete list.

0-9
 15 Minute Drama
 15 Minute Musical
 15 Storeys High
 1834
 1966 and All That
 2000 Years of Radio
 20th Century Vampire
 3 for All
 606
 The 7th Dimension
 The 99p Challenge

A
 Absolute Power
 Acropolis Now
 Across the Universe
 Adam and Joe
 The Adventures of John and Tony
 After Henry
 Afternoon Theatre
 The Alan Davies Show
 Aliens in the Mind
 All Change
 All Gas and Gaiters
 And This is Them
 Another Digance Indulgence
 Any Answers?
 Any Questions?
 The Archers
 Arrested Development
 Arthur Smith's Balham Bash
 As Time Goes By
 At Home with the Hardys
 The Attractive Young Rabbi
 Audio Diaries
 Awayday

B
 Babblewick Hall
 BBC OS
 BBC World Theatre
 Ballylenon
 Balti Kings
 Bandwagon
 Bangers and Mash
 Barrymore Plus Four
 Bearded Ladies
 Bernie Clifton's Comedy Shop
 Between the Ears
 Beyond the Back of Beyond
 Beyond the Pole
 Beyond Our Ken
 The Big Booth
 The Big Fun Show
 Big Jim and the Figaro Club
 The Big Top 40 Show
 The Big Town All Stars
 The Bigger Issues
 Blake's 7
 Book at Bedtime
 Bookcases
 Booked!
 Brain of Britain
 The Brains Trust
 Brian Appleton's History of Rock 'n' Roll
 Brian Gulliver's Travels
 Bristow
 Broadcasting House
 The Boosh (radio series)

C
 Cabaret on 4
 The Cabaret Upstairs
 Cabin Pressure
 Caesar the Geezer
 Caribbean Voices
 A Case for Dr. Morelle
 Central 822
 Chambers
 The Change
 Children's Favourites
 Children's Hour
 Children's Hour with Armstrong and Miller
 The Circle
 Clare in the Community
 Cliffhanger
 The Clitheroe Kid
 Comedy Album Heroes
 Coming Alive
 Composer of the Week
 Concrete Cow
 The Consultants
 Count Arthur Strong's Radio Show
 Counterpoint
 Cousin Bazilio
 The Craig Charles Funk and Soul Show
 Crème de la Crime
 The Cumberland Sausage Show
 Curlew in Autumn

D
 Dad's Army
 Dan and Nick: The Wildebeest Years
 Dead Man Talking
 Dead Ringers
 Dedicated Troublemaker
 Delve Special
 The Department
 Desert Island Discs
 Dick Barton, Special Agent
 Digital Planet
 Do Go On
 Dr Finlay's Casebook
 Doctor in the House
 Doctor at Large
 Doctor Thorne
 Doctor Who
 Does the Team Think?
 Double Bill
 Down the Line
 Down Your Way

E
 Earthsearch
 Ectoplasm
 Elastic Planet
 Elephants to Catch Eels
 ElvenQuest
 The Embassy Lark
 Erratically Charged
 Europe Today
 Exes

F
 Fab TV
 Face the Facts
 Faithful Departed
 The Fall of the Mausoleum Club
 Family Favourites
 Fanshawe Gets to the Bottom of...
 Farming Today
 Fat Chance
 Feedback
 Fellah's Hour with The Cheese Shop
 File on 4
 Fist of Fun
 Five Squeezy Pieces
 Flight of the Conchords
 Flying the Flag
 The Food Programme
 Foothill Fables
 The Forum
 The Foundation Trilogy
 Four Joneses and a Jenkins
 Frank Muir Goes Into...
 Frankie Howerd's Forum
 Friday Night is Music Night
 From Our Own Correspondent
 From the Bookshelf/Shelf
 Front Row

G
 GALAXY
 Gardeners' Question Time
 The Ghost at Number Ten
 Girlies
 A Good Read
 The Good Human Guide
 The Goon Show
 Graham Norton's News Lasso
 Grassblade Jungle
 Grease Monkeys
 The Griff Rhys Jones Show
 The Grumbleweeds Radio Show
 Guilty Party

H
 Hancock's Half Hour
 HARDTalk
 The Hare Lane Diaries
 Harvey and the Wallbangers
 Haunted
 Heated Rollers
 Hello, Cheeky!
 Hirsty's Daily Dose
 The Hislop Vote
 A History of the World in 100 Objects
 hit40uk
 Hitchhiker's Guide to the Future
 The Hitchhiker's Guide to the Galaxy
 Hoax!
 The Hobbit
 Home Truths
 Host Planet Earth
 House of Unspeakable Secrets
 How Things Began
 Huddwinks
 The Hudson and Pepperdine Show
 The Human Zoo

I
 I'm Glad You Asked Me That
 I'm Sorry I Haven't A Clue
 I'm Sorry, I'll Read That Again
 The Impressionists
 In Conversation
 The In Crowd
 In One Ear
 In the End
 Injury Time
 Inman and Friends
 Inner Voices
 Inspector West at Bay
 The Iron Road
 It'll Never Last...
 It's That Man Again
 It's Your Round

J
 Jamaica Inn
 Jammin'
 Jeremy Hardy Speaks to the Nation
 John Shuttleworth's Open Mind
 Just Juliette
 Just a Minute
 Just Perfick Shoes

K
 Kaleidoscope
 The Ken Dodd Show
 Ken Dodd's Palace of Laughter
 King of Bath
 King of the Road
 King Street Junior
 King Stupid
 Knowing Me Knowing You with Alan Partridge

L
 Last Word
 Late
 Late Junction
 Lee and Herring
 Legal, Decent, Honest and Truthful
 Lent Talks
 Letter from America
 A Life of Bliss
 Life, Death and Sex with Mike and Sue
 Life with Dexter
 Life With The Lyons
 Like They've Never Been Gone
 Linda Smith's A Brief History of Timewasting
 Lines From My Grandfather's Forehead
 Lionel Nimrod's Inexplicable World
 Listen with Mother
 The Little Big Woman Radio Show
 Little Britain
 Living with Betty
 The Living World
 A Look Back at the Nineties
 Loose Ends
 Lord Peter Wimsey
 Losers
 Love 40: New Balls Please
 Lucky Heather

M
 MacFlintock's Palace
 Mammon
 Many a Slip
 Man of Soup
 The Mark Steel Lectures
 The Mark Steel Solution
 Mars Project
 The Mausoleum Club
 The Men from the Ministry
 Midweek
 Midweek Theatre
 The Milligan Papers
 The Million Pound Radio Show
 Millport
 Mitch Benn's Crimes Against Music
 The Mitch Benn Music Show
 Molesworth
 Money Box
 Moon Over Morocco
 The Moral Maze
 The Motorway Men
 The Museum of Everything
 My Muse
 Music While You Work
 My Uncle Freddie
 My Word!
 The Metal Hall

N
 The Nallon Tapes
 The Name's the Game
 Nature
 The Navy Lark
 The Network Chart Show
 The Newly Discovered Casebook of Sherlock Holmes
 Newsbeat
 Newsday
 Newshour
 Newsjack
 The News Huddlines
 The News Quiz
 Nicholas Nickleby
 Nightcap
 Night Waves
 The Nimmo Twins
 Nineteen Ninety-Four
 Nineteen Ninety-Eight
 No Commitments
 Not in Front of the Children
 Nothing's Gonna Change My World
 The Now Show

O
 Old Harry's Game
 Omar Khayyam
 On the Hour
 On the Job
 On the Town with The League of Gentlemen
 One
 One Lump or Two?
 Oobo Joobu
 Open Book
 Opera on 3
 Orbit One Zero
 Orbiter X
 The O'Show
 Outlook
 Overland Patrol

P
 The Party Party
 The Patrick and Maureen Maybe Music Experience
 Paul Temple
 People Like Us
 Peter Dickson Presents Nightcap
 Pick of the Pops
 PM
 Poetry Please
 Pop Go the Beatles
 The Press Gang
 The Price of Fear
 Probe
 Pull the Other One!
 Puzzle Panel

Q
 Quando, Quando, Quando
 The Quatermass Memoirs
 Quote... Unquote

R
 RadioTalk from The Radio Academy
 Radio Active
 Radio Newsreel
 Radio Shuttleworth
 The Random Jottings of Hinge and Bracket
 The Remains of Foley and McColl
 Revolting People
 The Right Time
 Ringo's Yellow Submarine
 Rolling Home
 Round Britain Quiz
 Round the Horne
 The Routes of English
 Routemasters
 Rumpole of the Bailey
 The Russ Abbot Show

S
 Saturday Club
 Saturday Live
 Saturday Night Fry
 Saturday Night Theatre
 Saturday Review
 Science in Action
 Sean Lock: 15 Storeys High
 Sexton Blake
 Shipping Forecast
 Sloe Coaches
 The Small World of Dominic Holland
 Smelling of Roses
 The Sofa of Time
 Some of Our Pilots are Missing
 Son of Cliché
 Sorry About Last Night
 Sounding Brass
 Special Courier
 Sport on Four
 Sports Report
 Sportsworld
 Stand Up to Screen
 Start the Week
 Steptoe and Son
 Steven Appleby's Normal Life
 Stockport... So Good They Named It Once
 Stop Messing About
 Stop the Week
 The Strand
 Streetsounds
 Stumped
 The Sunday Play
 Sunny Side Up

T
 Take It From Here
 Take Me to Your Reader
 Tales from the Backbench
 Tales from the Mausoleum Club
 Test Match Special
 Thanks a Lot, Milton Jones!
 That Mocking Bird
 That Reminds Me
 Think the Unthinkable
 This Is Craig Brown
 This Sceptred Isle: The 20th Century
 This Sceptred Isle: The Dynasties
 Tickling the Ivories
 Today
 Top of the Form
 Trivia Test Match
 The Truck
 True Stories from Britain
 Two Doors Down
 Two Priests and a Nun Go into a Pub...

U
 UK Music Week
 UK Radio
 The Unbelievable Truth
 Underneath the Arches
 Unnatural Acts
 Up to the Hour

V
 Variety Bandbox
 Variety Playhouse
 The Very World of Milton Jones
 Voyage

W
 Waggoners' Walk
 Waiting Gate
 The Way It Is
 Weak at the Top
 Week Ending
 Week in Westminster
 The Weekend Starts Here
 Westminster Hour
 Westway
 What the Papers Say
 Whatever Happened to ...?
 White Nights
 Whose Line Is It Anyway?
 Wild Justice
 Wise on the Wireless
 Woman's Hour
 Word of Mouth
 The Wordsmiths of Gorsemere
 Workers' Playtime
 The World as We Know It
 The World at One
 The World This Weekend
 The World Today
 The World Tonight
 World Have Your Say
 World of Pub
 World Update
 The Write Stuff

X
 X Marks the Spot

Y
 Yes Sir, I Can Boogie
 You Start, I'll Join In
 You and Yours
 Young Pioneers

References
 Swartz, Jon D., & Robert C. Reinehr.  Handbook of Old-Time Radio: a comprehensive guide to golden age radio listening and collecting.  Scarecrow Press, 1993.

See also

 List of Canadian radio programs
 List of US radio programs

Programmes
British